Annette Claire Baier (née Stoop; 11 October 1929 – 2 November 2012) was a New Zealand philosopher and Hume scholar, focused in particular on Hume's moral psychology. She was well known also for her contributions to feminist philosophy and to the philosophy of mind, where she was strongly influenced by her former colleague, Wilfrid Sellars.

Biography
Baier earned bachelor's and master's degrees at the University of Otago in her native Dunedin, New Zealand. In 1952 she went to Somerville College, Oxford, where she earned her PhD and met fellow philosophers Philippa Foot and G.E.M. Anscombe. For most of her career she taught in the philosophy department at the University of Pittsburgh, having moved there from Carnegie Mellon University. She retired to Dunedin.

She was former President of the Eastern Division of the American Philosophical Association, an office reserved for the elite of her profession. Baier received an honorary Doctor of Literature from the University of Otago in 1999.

Her husband was the philosopher Kurt Baier.

Ethics
Baier's approach to ethics is that women and men make their decisions about right and wrong based on different value systems: men take their moral decisions according to an idea of justice, while women are motivated by a sense of trust or caring. The history of philosophy having been overwhelmingly compiled by men, she suggests, leads to a body of thought which apparently ignores the role of nurture and trust in human philosophy.

Bibliography

Books 
  
  
 , including especially "What Do Women Want in an Ethical Theory?" and "The Need For More Than Justice".

Chapters in books

References

External links
Trust  1991 Tanner Lecture by Annette Baier
Obituary: Annette C. Baier in the University Times of the University Of Pittsburgh
 Annette Baier, 1929-2012 In Memoriam posted by The Hume Society

1929 births
2012 deaths
20th-century American philosophers
21st-century American philosophers
Writers from Dunedin
New Zealand philosophers
University of Otago alumni
Alumni of Somerville College, Oxford
Hume scholars
Moral psychologists
New Zealand women philosophers
Animal welfare scholars
Philosophers from Pennsylvania
New Zealand women writers